In the 1905 St. Louis Browns season they finished 8th in the American League with a record of 54 wins and 99 losses.

Offseason 
 December 26, 1904: Jesse Burkett was traded by the Browns to the Boston Americans for George Stone and cash.
 February 1905: The Browns traded a player to be named later to the Chicago White Sox for Branch Rickey. The Browns completed the deal by sending Frank Roth to the White Sox in June.

Regular season

Season standings

Record vs. opponents

Roster

Player stats

Batting

Starters by position 
Note: Pos = Position; G = Games played; AB = At bats; H = Hits; Avg. = Batting average; HR = Home runs; RBI = Runs batted in

Other batters 
Note: G = Games played; AB = At bats; H = Hits; Avg. = Batting average; HR = Home runs; RBI = Runs batted in

Pitching

Starting pitchers 
Note: G = Games pitched; IP = Innings pitched; W = Wins; L = Losses; ERA = Earned run average; SO = Strikeouts

Other pitchers 
Note: G = Games pitched; IP = Innings pitched; W = Wins; L = Losses; ERA = Earned run average; SO = Strikeouts

Relief pitchers 
Note: G = Games pitched; W = Wins; L = Losses; SV = Saves; ERA = Earned run average; SO = Strikeouts

Notes

References 
1905 St. Louis Browns team page at Baseball Reference
1905 St. Louis Browns season at baseball-almanac.com

St. Louis Browns seasons
Saint Louis Browns season
St Louis